Susana Martres ( 1921–1942) was an Argentine actress and poet, best remembered for her roles in From the Hills to the Valley (1938), and La luna en el pozo (1942).

References 

20th-century deaths
Argentine poets
Argentine actresses